Wael Sulaiman Al-Habashi (born August 8, 1964) was the first player of the Kuwait national football team to score a golden goal. The goal was scored against the UAE in 1994.

Club career
Sulaiman played his entire career for Al-Jahra, where he won the 1989–90 Kuwait Premier League.

International career
Sulaiman was part of the Kuwaiti team which won the 8th Arabian Gulf Cup. However, he played his first international match against China in the 1986 Asian Games quarterfinals, where his team reached the third place. Later on, he won both the 10th Arabian Gulf Cup and 13th Arabian Gulf Cup. Between the two aforementioned tournaments, he managed to finish third with his team at the 1994 Asian Games, where he was the top scorer with six goals.

He retired on 27 December 1998, becoming the first Kuwaiti to have more than 100 caps.

Honour
 AFC Century Award

See also
 List of men's footballers with 100 or more international caps

References

External links

People from Kuwait City
Kuwaiti footballers
1964 births
Living people
Association football defenders
FIFA Century Club
Asian Games medalists in football
Footballers at the 1986 Asian Games
Footballers at the 1990 Asian Games
Footballers at the 1994 Asian Games
1988 AFC Asian Cup players
1996 AFC Asian Cup players
Asian Games bronze medalists for Kuwait
Medalists at the 1986 Asian Games
Medalists at the 1994 Asian Games
Kuwait international footballers
Kuwait Premier League players
Al Jahra SC players